The Loun language is an extinct Austronesian language once spoken in Indonesia, mainly in the Maluku archipelago.

References

Central Maluku languages
Languages of Indonesia
Endangered Austronesian languages
Seram Island
Extinct languages of Oceania